The NCAA Boxing Championship was discontinued by the National Collegiate Athletic Association after 1960. The popularity of college boxing peaked in 1948, when 55 colleges participated in intercollegiate competition. The popularity of college boxing had been waning in the years leading up to 1960, and only 20 teams competed at the 1959 championship. At the 1960 NCAA Championships Charlie Mohr, a boxer on the University of Wisconsin–Madison team, collapsed with a brain hemorrhage and died one week later.

In 1976, American collegiate boxing was picked up again by the National Collegiate Boxing Association. In 2012, the United States Intercollegiate Boxing Association (USIBA) was formed and hosted the first National Championships for women alongside a men's division.  The first USIBA Championships were hosted at the University of San Francisco in 2013.

Championships
The first year of NCAA sponsorship of the championship was 1932. However, national championships were conducted in 1924–31 as well. Before 1948, NCAA team boxing championships were unofficial because team points were not officially awarded.

Unofficial team champions
1924 Penn State
1925 Navy
1926 Navy
1927 Penn State
1928 Navy
1929 Penn State
1930 Penn State
1931 Navy
1932 Penn State
1936 Syracuse
1937 Washington State
1938 (co-champions)
Catholic University
Virginia
West Virginia
1939 Wisconsin
1940 Idaho
1941 Idaho
1942 Wisconsin
1943 Wisconsin
1947 Wisconsin

Team champions
1948 Wisconsin
1949 LSU
1950 (co-champions)
Idaho
Gonzaga
1951 Michigan State
1952 Wisconsin
1953 Idaho State
1954 Wisconsin
1955 Michigan State
1956 Wisconsin
1957 Idaho State
1958 San Jose State
1959 San Jose State
1960 San Jose State

Team titles

See also
 
 
"Penn State Has Won 66 National Team Championships"
Pre-NCAA Boxing Champions
Intercollegiate sports team champions
Collegiate Nationals

References

Boxing
College boxing in the United States